The FIBA Intercontinental Cup Most Valuable Player (MVP) Award is the award bestowed to the player that is deemed to be the most valuable player" of the FIBA Intercontinental Cup official world basketball club championship. The winner of the award is decided by FIBA and is given after the final of the competition, usually to a player on the winning team.

Award winners

The award has been won by 11 different players thus far.

Statistics

By club 
CB Canarias holds the record for most players with a MVP award, with 3.

By nationality 
Players from the United States have won the most awards, with three players playing under the American nationality winning MVP.

See also 
FIBA Intercontinental Cup

Notes

References

External links
FIBA official website
FIBA Intercontinental Cup official website
FIBA Intercontinental Cup History
Basquetepinheirense FIBA World Cup 
FIBA World Cup of Clubs 

MVP
Basketball most valuable player awards